Hikurangi may refer to:

 Hikurangi, a settlement in Northland, New Zealand
 Hikurangi River, a river in Northland, New Zealand
 Hikurangi Trench, an ocean trough off the East Coast of the North Island of New Zealand
 Hikurangi Plateau, an oceanic plateau off the East Coast of the North Island of New Zealand
 Hikurangi, the traditional Te Kawerau ā Maki name for West Auckland, New Zealand

Peaks 
 Mount Hikurangi (Gisborne District), a mountain near Ruatoria on the East Coast, New Zealand
 Mount Hikurangi (Northland), a mountain near Kaikohe in Northland, New Zealand
 Hikurangi, a volcanic cone near the settlement of Hikurangi in Northland, New Zealand
 Hikurangi, a cone near Taumarunui, New Zealand